Māris Smirnovs (born 2 June 1976, in Daugavpils) is a former Latvian football defender, currently the assistant manager of FK Ventspils, playing in the Latvian Higher League.

Smirnovs has played 22 international matches for Latvia national football team. He debuted in 2002, and played at the Euro 2004.

Māris Smirnovs played for Dinaburg FC, FK Valmiera, FK Ventspils, Amica Wronki, FC Ditton, Dinamo București, Górnik Zabrze, FK Jūrmala and FC Tranzit. After the 2010 Latvian Higher League season Smirnovs retired from professional football.

Before the start of the 2012 Latvian First League season Smirnovs was appointed as the assistant manager of FK Ventspils-2. In 2013, he became the assistant manager of FK Ventspils first team.

External links
Latvian Football Federation (in Latvian)

1976 births
Living people
Latvian footballers
Latvia international footballers
UEFA Euro 2004 players
FC Dinamo București players
Amica Wronki players
FK Ventspils players
Dinaburg FC players
Górnik Zabrze players
FC Tranzīts players
Expatriate footballers in Romania
Expatriate footballers in Poland
Liga I players
Latvian expatriate sportspeople in Romania
Sportspeople from Daugavpils
Latvian expatriate sportspeople in Poland
Latvian expatriate footballers
Association football defenders
Latvian people of Russian descent